Trickstar Games was a computer game developer founded in 2009, developing content for Nintendo and Sony-based platforms, as well as Microsoft desktop-based computers. Based in Melbourne, Australia, Trickstar Games is led by Mike Fegan and Tony Parkes, and titles include International Cricket 2010, JASF: Jane's Advanced Strike Fighters and the ill-fated Ashes Cricket 2013.

An application was made to wind up Trickstar Games Pty Ltd on 12/05/2015.

Ashes Cricket 2013
Shortly after release on 21 November 2013 the game received significant negative reviews as well as several YouTube videos featuring significant bugs in gameplay owing to the newly developed game engine for the title which was not ready for release. Four days after release, it was removed from sale and production officially cancelled, with all the game's users receiving a refund and all links removed from the Trickstar Games website. It was strongly criticised as one of the worst games of 2013.

References

External links
 Official website
 Trickstar Games Director Mike Fegan on Ashes Cricket 2013, 29 May 2013
 Ashes Cricket 2013 game taken off sale, 28 November 2013

Companies based in Melbourne
Video game companies established in 2009
Australian companies established in 2009
Video game development companies
Defunct video game companies of Australia